William Esplin Ormond  (23 February 1927 – 4 May 1984) was a Scottish football player and manager. As a player, Ormond was well known as one of Hibernian's Famous Five forward line, winning three league championships in the late 1940s and early 1950s. After a successful spell managing St Johnstone he led Scotland to the 1974 World Cup finals. Scotland were unbeaten at that World Cup, but were eliminated on goal difference.

Ormond was appointed an Officer of the Order of the British Empire (OBE) in the 1975 New Year Honours.

Playing career

Club
Born in Falkirk, Ormond began his career nearby at Stenhousemuir. He then signed for Hibernian in November 1946. An outside-left, he played for Hibs over a fifteen-year period. He was one of the "Famous Five" forward line, one of the strongest front fives ever in Scottish football. The other forwards were Bobby Johnstone, Lawrie Reilly, Gordon Smith and Eddie Turnbull, who each scored over 100 goals for the club. Ormond scored a total of 187 goals in 503 appearances in all games for Hibs, and won the Scottish League Championship three times. He was the last member of the Famous Five to leave Hibs, signing for hometown Falkirk in 1961.

Scotland
Ormond won six Scotland full international caps, and he played in Scotland's ill-fated venture to the 1954 FIFA World Cup finals. Ormond also represented the Scottish League XI 10 times.

Managerial career
After he retired from playing, Ormond became assistant trainer at Falkirk.

St Johnstone
In 1967, he was appointed as manager of St Johnstone. He led the club to the 1969 Scottish League Cup Final (October) and third in the 1970–71 Scottish Football League campaign behind Celtic and Aberdeen. This league finish meant that St Johnstone qualified for European competition for the first time. Ormond is still remembered as one of the club's most revered figures and his contribution to the club was later recognised by the club naming the South Stand at McDiarmid Park in his honour.

One of the reasons Ormond's time at St Johnstone is so fondly remembered was the quality of football he played, with his 'if you score two we'll score three' outlook. The abilities of players such as John Connolly, Henry Hall, Kenny Aird and Jim Pearson enhanced the attacking style of play.

Although greatly disappointed at Ormond leaving in 1972, St Johnstone were proud that he had become manager of Scotland.

Scotland National Team
The Scottish Football Association replaced Tommy Docherty with Ormond in 1973 after Docherty left to join Manchester United. Ormond guided Scotland to the 1974 World Cup Finals in West Germany. Scotland beat Zaire and drew with Brazil and Yugoslavia to return home as the only unbeaten team in the tournament. They were eliminated after the group stage first round, but this remains the best-ever performance by a Scotland team in a World Cup.	

UEFA Euro 1976 qualifying was unsuccessful in large part due to losing 2–1 at home to Spain in the campaign opener. On 5 February 1975 he sent Paul Wilson on as a 75th-minute substitute in the return game in Valencia (a 1–1 draw); this was the only appearance by a non-white footballer in the Scotland national team in the 20th century.

Ormond resigned as Scotland manager in May 1977.

Heart of Midlothian
In May 1977 Ormond was appointed as manager of Heart of Midlothian – the arch rivals of his old team, Hibs. Ormond was dismissed in 1980.

Hibernian
Ormond returned to Hibernian as assistant to his old Famous Five colleague Eddie Turnbull. When Turnbull resigned, Ormond took over as manager but he was forced to retire soon afterwards due to health issues.

Personal life

His brother Gibby also played league football, for Airdrie, Dundee United, Cowdenbeath and Alloa. Gibby also represented the Scottish League. Another brother, Bert Ormond, emigrated and represented New Zealand at international level in 1962.

Career statistics

International

Scores and results list Scotland's goal tally first, score column indicates score after each Ormond goal.

Managerial record

References

External links
 
 

1927 births
1984 deaths
Footballers from Falkirk
Association football wingers
Scottish footballers
Scotland international footballers
Scotland B international footballers
Scottish Football League players
Stenhousemuir F.C. players
Hibernian F.C. players
Falkirk F.C. players
Scottish Football Hall of Fame inductees
Scottish football managers
Scotland national football team managers
Heart of Midlothian F.C. managers
St Johnstone F.C. managers
Hibernian F.C. managers
Hibernian F.C. non-playing staff
1954 FIFA World Cup players
1974 FIFA World Cup managers
Falkirk F.C. non-playing staff
Scottish Football League representative players
Scottish Football League managers
Officers of the Order of the British Empire